The Bluegreen Vacations Duel, formerly known as the Twin 125s, is a NASCAR Cup Series preliminary event to the Daytona 500 held annually in February at Daytona International Speedway. It consists of two  races, which both serve as a qualifying race for the Daytona 500. The finishing order in the two  races, held on the Thursday before the Daytona 500, determine the starting lineup for the Daytona 500 held on race day.

Qualifying for the Daytona 500 is unique in NASCAR. Only the two front row starters (the pole and "outside pole") are determined by the standard knockout qualifying system. For all other drivers it only determines their starting position in their Duel, with odd placed cars being entered into the first Duel and even placed cars going in the second. After the Top 2 positions are locked in, the next 30 places of starting grid of the Daytona 500 is set by the finishing order of these two races with the top 15 (excluding pole winner and outside pole) making up the next 15 places on the inside and outside lanes respectively. After the Duels are completed the four fastest non-qualifiers by time and finally the six or seven (if no past champion's exemption is needed) highest-earning teams in points (from the previous season's standings) not in the race yet advance (also set by time), and the starting grid for the Daytona 500 would then be set. The order is still subject to change if technical regulations are violated.

History

The event began as twin 100-mile (40-lap) races. From 1959 to 1971, the races were counted with points towards the Grand National championship. Purses awarded were counted separately from those awarded in the Daytona 500. For 1968, the races were scheduled for  each, but were cancelled due to rain, and the starting lineup for the 1968 Daytona 500 fell back on the timed laps. In 1969, the races were extended again to 125 miles (50 laps). Lengthening the races added the need for a pit stop, increasing the complexity and excitement of the races.

For 1972, NASCAR's modern era commenced, and the races were dropped from the Grand National schedule as points-paying championship events. As part of Winston's changes to the series, races were required to be at least  to be included as official points events. The races continued, however, as a non-points event. CBS began covering the event in the early 1980s, airing them tape-delayed and edited the day before the Daytona 500.

With the introduction of restrictor plates in 1988, the resulting reduction in speed and fuel consumption again allowed drivers to possibly complete the race without a pit stop. Nine times from 1988 to 2004, one of the races went without a caution, and without a pit stop by the winner. In 2003, rules had been put in place requiring smaller fuel tanks on restrictor plate tracks (from  down to ), which effectively forced a pit stop once again.

Starting in 2001, the races were shown live on television, as the Daytona 500 would rotate between FOX/FX and NBC/TNT from 2001 to 2006.

In 2005, the races were lengthened to 150 miles (60-laps), given a new name, the Gatorade Duel, and from 2005 to 2012, used NASCAR's All-Exempt Tour format (similar to golf, but better known within NASCAR circles as the "top 35 rule").  The grids changed from even-odd qualifiers to a combination of even-odd based on the front row drivers by speed, then previous year's points standings (even-odd) of exempt and non-exempt teams by speed. A rain delay in 2006 saw the second race finish under the lights.

Starting in 2007, the Gatorade Duel is shown live on Speed, under the new broadcast agreement. That same year, allegations of cheating involving Michael Waltrip Racing came up. In 2013, Budweiser took over as sponsor of the Duels.

During Speedweeks 2013, Daytona International Speedway announced that the qualifying races would be held in prime-time and under stadium lighting on the Thursday before the Daytona 500 beginning in 2014, the races' debut on Fox Sports 1.

From 2016 to 2018, the races were renamed the Can-Am Duel after new title sponsor Bombardier Recreational Products' range of Can-Am All-terrain vehicles.

The Duels became a points event once again in 2017 with the unveiling of a new race format. The two race winners will receive ten points for their victories.

Format
Busch Pole qualifying is currently held one week prior to the Daytona 500. Since 2003, it has been held the Sunday before (except in 2010, when qualifying was held on Saturday to avoid conflict with Super Bowl XLIV). Prior to that, it was held the Saturday before (except for 1992) and the Wednesday before prior to the 1980s. Standard three-round knockout qualifying procedures are used for restrictor plate tracks.  The fastest qualifier in the third round wins the pole position for the Daytona 500, and second fastest in the third round is considered the second starting position, also known as the "outside pole". Both front row starters are locked into those positions on the Daytona 500 starting grid.
The two fastest qualifiers above (the Daytona 500 pole winner and the "outside pole" winner) are awarded the first starting position on the grid for each of the two Duel races, respectively.
Drivers who qualify in odd-numbered positions in Q3 start in the first Can Am Duel, while those who qualify in even-numbered ones in that round start in the second Duel. This fills positions 1–6 in each Duel.
The 12 drivers eliminated after Q2 have their Q2 times determine their starting position. The fastest driver eliminated in Q2, based on Q2 times only, starts 7th in the first Duel, while the second-fastest driver in Q2 starts in that position in the second one and based on position of elimination from Q2, they start in the first (odd) or second (even) numbered positions.
Drivers eliminated after Q1 will have Q1 times determine their starting position. The fastest driver eliminated in Q1 starts 13th in the first Duel, while the second-fastest driver eliminated in Q1 starts in there in the second one.

Pre-charter format (except 2005–12)
The Top 15 (14 until 2004) finishers in each Twin 125 race (excluding the two original front row qualifiers) advanced to the Daytona 500 starting lineup.
The Top 15 (14 until 2004) from the first race (excluding the original pole position winner) filled the inside portions of rows 2 through 16 (15 until 2004).
The Top 15 (14 until 2004) from the second race (excluding the original outside pole winner) filled the outside portions of rows 2 through 16 (15 until 2004).
After both races, the remaining non-qualifiers revert to their original qualifying speeds. Until NASCAR imposed the charter system in 2016, the four fastest remaining cars were assigned positions 33–36. This format has been in place from 1998 to 2003 and 2013 to 2015. This rule was to generally protect fast qualifying cars that suffered a crash or engine failure during the heats.
In 2015 with knockout qualifying, a driver's qualifying speed is based on his fastest, regardless of it taking place in Q1, Q2, or Q3.
For 1998–2003, qualifying speeds filled positions 31–36.
For 1995–1997 and 2004, qualifying speeds filled positions 31–38.
Through 1994, qualifying speeds filled positions 31–40.
The final starting positions (37-42) were reserved for provisionals. The highest entries in championship owner points (not driver points) from the previous season that have not yet made the field are assigned grid positions 37–42.
Prior to 1995, the provisional system varies, with typically two cars added.
From 1995 to 1997, four provisionals were used.
From 1998 to 2003, seven provisionals were used.
In 2004, five provisionals were used.
Provisionals are assigned by owner points from the previous season.
Since 1990, the 43rd and final spot on the grid were tentatively reserved for the most recent NASCAR Cup champion not yet in the field. The "Champions Provisional" is used if needed, but if there are no former Cup champions in need of the slot, it reverts to a standard provisional spot. (This provisional was abolished with the charter system in 2016.)
Since 2013, after the seven provisionals are assigned, the starting order of positions 37 through 40 is determined by fastest qualifying speeds. Under the current charter system, the rule is in effect, but only for positions 39 and 40, for open (non-chartered) cars.

All Exempt Tour Format/"Top 35 Rule" (2005–2012)
Between the 2005 and 2012 seasons, the Duel used different rules because of NASCAR's All Exempt Tour format (better known as the "top 35 rule") used at the time for the NASCAR Cup Series.
All exempt teams (the previous season's Top 35 teams through owner points), along with the two drivers who qualified for the front row – the top two drivers from qualifying (if they are not exempt teams) are locked into the Daytona 500 starting field, regardless of finishing position in the Duel races.
The pole position winner is given the pole for the first Duel, and the driver who qualifies second is given the pole for the second Duel; regardless of their exempt status.
Exempt teams (excluding the pole and "outside pole" winners) are split among the two Duels based on their owner points position from the previous season. Odd-numbered points positions are entered into the first Duel and even-numbered points positions are entered into the second Duel.
 If both teams on the front row in the Daytona 500 are even-positioned teams from the previous year's points (and would be in Duel 2), the slowest exempt team of the odd-positioned teams, based on the final points standings from the previous year, is moved to Duel 2.  This was used in the 2012 Duels.
Non-exempt entries are split between the two qualifying races. The top qualifier among non-exempt teams provided the team is not on the front row is slotted into the second race (along with even ranked non-exempt qualifiers) are split into the second race, and even ranked qualifiers are in the first race (as if they were called 36th and 37th, et al.), unless both front row starters were odd or even teams from the previous year, or if one of the two non-exempt teams makes the front row.
After the participants are determined for the two Duels, the actual lineups for the two Duels revert to overall time trial speed rank.
The Top 2 finishers among the non-exempt teams (excluding any that happened to qualify on the front row) from each Duel advance to the Daytona 500.
Starting positions 3-39 are finalized by Duel finishes. Drivers from the first Duel start on the inside and drivers from the second Duel start on the outside.
Starting positions 3-40 (or 41) are finalized in this manner if one (or both) front row starter is a non-exempt team.
One to four additional positions are filled by non-exempt entries by original time trial speeds.
 If both front row starters are non-exempt teams, only one position is available. If the 43rd position is not needed, two positions are available.
 If one front row starters is a non-exempt team, two (or three) positions are available.
 If both front row starters are exempt teams, three (or four) positions are available.  This brings the field to 42 cars.
 If there is a former NASCAR Cup Series champion driver who raced in the previous season racing for a non-exempt team and has yet to qualify, the most recent former champion not in the field yet takes the 43rd position.  It is not unusual for a non-exempt team to seek out a former champion as their driver, as it provides an easier way to qualify.  Otherwise, an extra position by time is available.

Charter-era format
Under the current charter system, because all chartered entries are guaranteed entry to every race of a season:
All finishers driving for chartered teams in each Duel (excluding the two original front row qualifiers) advanced to the Daytona 500 starting lineup; the first race determines the starting position of the inside row and the second determines the outside row.
The highest-placed "open" entry (entering the race without a charter) of each duel race will advance, based on their finishing position (for a total of two cars each). This also determines their starting position.
Two fastest non-chartered drivers that advanced based on qualifying speeds alone will start on the last row of the Daytona 500, for a total of four non-chartered cars (NASCAR reduced the starting grid from 43 to 40 with the introduction of the system). 
If the "open" driver that was the top unchartered entry in the duel race was also the fastest non-chartered driver in the time trials, the fastest "open" driver not locked-in that way will advance on their qualifying time alone. Otherwise, their time would be used as a fallback for them to start on the last row of the event.

The arrangement of the Duels under the charter system notably cost Ty Dillon a starting spot in 2021 when Ryan Preece beat him during the Duels as Dillon, despite still finishing in the top-10, did not have a fast enough qualifying time compared to his non-chartered peers.

Early years
In the early years of the Daytona 500, the rules for the qualifying races varied widely. In 1959, the first race comprised the Convertible series, while the second comprised the Grand National series. The Top 20 finishers in each race advanced to the Daytona 500, while a last-chance,  consolation race was held on Saturday, to fill the field to a maximum of 65 cars.
In early years, the qualifying races were held on the Friday prior to the Daytona 500, rather than the current Thursday.
On rare occasions, a 75-mile "consolation race" was also held.
In some early years, pole qualifying for the Daytona 500 was held on Wednesday, the day before the qualifying races. It was eventually moved up to the weekend before, and returned to Wednesday in 2021.
Typically, until 2014, the faster of two laps in single-car qualifying determined starting positions for the Duels and the front row for the 500.

Notes
In 2010, Jimmie Johnson and Kasey Kahne had a combined victory margin of .019 over second place drivers Kevin Harvick and Tony Stewart.
Dale Earnhardt set a record by winning one of the Twin 125 races for ten consecutive years, twelve times overall, as well as six Bud Shootouts, before winning the 1998 Daytona 500.
Jeff Gordon won a Twin 125 in 1993, his rookie season. It marked his first win in a NASCAR Winston Cup event, however, it did not count as an official points-paying victory. Jeff would go on to finish 5th in that year's Daytona 500. He did not win an official points race until the 1994 Coca-Cola 600 at Charlotte.
In 2007 Jeff Gordon won the race, but failed the post race inspection. He then "earned" the lowest Daytona 500 starting spot for a race winner, starting in 42nd place, but he was still credited with the victory.
Since the race became a non-championship heat race in 1971, two drivers who did not win a Cup race, Coo Coo Marlin and Mike Skinner, have won the race.
Four drivers have been killed in qualifying races.  Talmadge "Tab" Prince was killed in 1970, Raymond "Friday" Hassler in 1972, Ricky Knotts in 1980 and Bruce Jacobi in 1983 (although he was in a coma for four years before dying in 1987).
Denny Hamlin won the second Gatorade Duel on February 14, 2008, making him the first ever Toyota driver to win a NASCAR Cup Series race.
 A driver each from Hendrick Motorsports and Joe Gibbs Racing won the Duel races from 2007 to 2009.
Randy LaJoie suffered a horrific crash in the 1984 UNO Twin 125 event when he spun out of turn 4, got airborne and slammed hard into the wall, then performed two backflips and a barrel roll, in an identical position as Ricky Rudd's Busch Clash accident days earlier.  A rash of Turn 4 incidents (including Darrell Waltrip's crash in the same area that resulted in a concussion that would have suspended him from competition immediately under current NASCAR rules during the previous year's Daytona 500) resulted in the grass apron graded and paved over for the Firecracker 400 that July.
Oddly, despite Richard Petty's wins at Daytona in championship competition, none of his official 200 wins included a qualifying race (1959–71).
2000 was Bill Elliott's only win as an owner/driver.

Past winners

Race notes 
1961: First race was shortened due to crash.
1974: Both races were shortened due to energy crisis (10% shorter).
2006: Both races were extended due to a green–white–checker finish.
2007, 2011 and 2018: First race was extended due to a NASCAR overtime.
2008, 2015 and 2021: Second race was extended due to a NASCAR overtime.
2017: Was the first time that points were on the line in Modern era (1972–present).
2021: Second race was delayed 3 hours for rain, finished early Friday morning.

Multiple winners (drivers)

Multiple winners (teams)

Manufacturer wins

Race 1

Race 2

Overall

References

External links
2011 Daytona 500 Gatorade Duels Line Up
Gatorade Duel Info And 2011 Pole Qualifying Results
Gatorade Duel #1 Race info page
Gatorade Duel #2 Race info page
NASCAR Commentators Crews and Networks

1959 establishments in Florida
 
NASCAR Cup Series races
Recurring sporting events established in 1959
Annual sporting events in the United States